Trivellona paucicostata is a species of small sea snail, a marine gastropod mollusk in the family Triviidae, the false cowries or trivias.

Subspecies
 Trivellona paucicostata valerieae (Hart, 1996): synonym of Trivellona valerieae (Hart, 1996)

Description
The length of the shell attains 8.7 mm.

Distribution
This marine species occurs off New Caledonia and the Philippines.

References

 Dolin, L. (2001). Les Triviidae (Mollusca: Caenogastropoda) de l'Indo-Pacifique: Révision des genres Trivia, Dolichupis et Trivellona = Indo-Pacific Triviidae (Mollusca: Caenogastropoda): Revision of Trivia, Dolichupis and Trivellona. in: Bouchet, P. et al. (Ed.) Tropical deep-sea benthos. Mémoires du Muséum national d'Histoire naturelle. Série A, Zoologie. 185: 201-241. 
 Fehse D. & Grego J. (2004) Contribution to the knowledge of the Triviidae (Mollusca: Gastropoda). IX. Revision of the genus Trivellona. Berlin and Banska Bystrica. Pubished as a CD in 2004; as a book in 2009.
 Fehse D. (2002) Beiträge zur Kenntnis der Triviidae (Mollusca: Gastropoda) V. Kritische Beurteilung der Genera und Beschreibung einer neuen Art der Gattung Semitrivia Cossmann, 1903. Acta Conchyliorum 6: 3-48.

Triviidae
Gastropods described in 1909